Global News: BC 1 (often referred to as BC 1) is a Canadian English language specialty channel owned by Corus Entertainment and operated alongside the Corus-owned Global Television Network's Vancouver owned-and-operated television station CHAN-DT (Global BC). The channel primarily broadcast local news for the province of British Columbia. The channel's branding is derived from the Global network and its news division Global News. It broadcasts from CHAN-DT's studios on 7850 Enterprise Street (across from the Lake City Way SkyTrain station) in Burnaby.

History
On January 11, 2012, Shaw Media announced its intention to launch a 24-hour local news channel for the province of British Columbia (the first regional news channel in Canada located outside of Ontario), that would be operated alongside Global's Vancouver station CHAN-DT, with an expected launch date of summer 2012.

The channel was approved by the Canadian Radio-television and Telecommunications Commission (CRTC) on July 20, 2012 under the tentative name "BC Global News". It was described as "a regional, English-language specialty Category B service that will offer a mix of local and regional news, traffic, weather, business, sports and entertainment information devoted to serving residents of British Columbia, with a special focus on the Vancouver/Victoria Extended Market, as defined by the Broadcast Bureau of Measurement (BBM) Canada." On the same day, Shaw Media announced its revised plan to launch the channel in early 2013 under the new name "Global News: BC 1".

On August 30, 2012, Global BC posted a statement about Global News: BC 1, which had expected to be launched in January 2013, claiming it "will provide viewers across the province with top local and regional stories" and will become an "important component of Global News' Digital First objective." The launch would later be delayed to March 14, 2013. The channel soft launched on March 14 at 8:00 a.m. PDT (14:00 UTC) and officially launched one hour later at 9:00 a.m. PT with the debut of the show AM/BC.

On April 1, 2016, Global News: BC 1's parent company Shaw Media (which also included parent network Global and 18 other specialty channels) was sold to Shaw's sister company Corus Entertainment, and the station earned four already owned radio stations for sister networks.

In October 2022, the channel was given a new logo and on-air graphics to coincide with Corus Entertainment's rebrand of all existing Global News properties.

Format

Global News: BC1 contains an 'L-frame' display at the bottom and right side of the channel's screen, which carries the day's top news headlines, weather, sports scores, and market indices, with regular banner ads interspersed. The channel simulcasts existing local news programming from Global BC—eight hours a day during the week and six hours daily on weekends. The channel does not carry any news programs produced by Global Okanagan—another Global owned-and-operated station serving the Okanagan region of British Columbia, although their reporters and anchors fill in and provide stories. An Okanagan focused news program at 9:25pm on weekday and 9:30pm on weekends, under the name "Global News on BC1", with Jordan Armstrong anchoring from Burnaby.

In January 2015, BC1 changed its on-screen graphics to white and light blue. On the right of the screen they put traffic cameras, live traffic feed.

References

External links
 
 Global BC

Television channels and stations established in 2013
24-hour television news channels in Canada
Digital cable television networks in Canada
Mass media in Burnaby
English-language television stations in Canada
Global Television Network
Corus Entertainment networks
Television stations in British Columbia
2013 establishments in British Columbia